The Atwood Music Festival, the longest running festival of its kind in the state of Mississippi, is an annual festival held near the banks of the Pearl River in Monticello, Mississippi on Memorial Day weekend in May. Originally called the Atwood Bluegrass Music Festival, the event was rebranded to feature a variety of different music styles. The Festival began as a joint effort by the Pearl River Basin Development District and the Lawrence County Chamber of Commerce in 1975 to promote the Atwood Water Park that had recently been completed by the Basin District.

The Festival has featured artists such as Stella Parton (sister of Dolly Parton), The Carter Family, Trace Adkins, John Anderson, Neal McCoy, Jeff Bates, Little Texas, Jamey Johnson, LoCash, Jake Owen, Chris Young, Craig Morgan, Travis Tritt, Emerson Drive, Kieth Anderson, and Charlie Daniels. Following Daniels's headlining performance in 2008, the Festival opted to contract several up-and-coming acts instead of 1 or 2 well-known headliners due to budget concerns.

Due to the COVID-19 pandemic, the 2020 Festival was moved from Memorial Day weekend in May to Labor Day weekend, September 4-5.

List of main performers 
 1975 - Lester Flatt and the Nashville Grass, Doc Watson
 1976 - Grandpa Jones, Jim & Jesse and the Virginia Boys
 1977 - Minnie Pearl, Paul Ott
 1978 - Dave and Sugar, Kurt Kilpatrick
 1979 - The Hager Twins, Jimmy Martin
 1980 - Stella Parton, The Carter Family
 1981 - Dave and Sugar, Rattlesnake Annie McGowan
 1982 - Helen Cornelius, Razzy Bailey, Paul Ott
 1983 - David Frizell and Shelly West, Jimmy C. Newman, Elmer Fudpucker
 1984 - Charly McClain, Vern Gosdin, Lorrie Morgan, Linda Nail, Kent Westberry
 1985 - Justin Tubb and the Texas Troubadors, Jacky Ward, Helen Cornelius, Kathy Twitty
 1986 - Dan Seals, Robin Killen
 1987 - Tom T. Hall, Mark Gray
 1988 - Jim Ed Brown, Shelley Mangrum
 1989 - Billy Crash Craddock, Mike Snider, Vicki Bird
 1990 - Baillie and the Boys, Irlene Mandrell, Jimmy C. Newman and Cajun Country
 1991 - Connie Smith, Scott McQuaig
 1992 - Gene Watson
 1993 - Ronnie McDowell, Mac McAnally
 1994 - Jimmy C. Newman, John Conlee, Pearl River
 1995 - Terry McBride and the Ride, James Dixon, Dave and Sugar
 1996 - Paul Overstreet, Lee Roy Parnell
 1997 - Ronnie McDowell, Confederate Railroad
 1998 - Wade Hayes, Doug Supernaw
 1999 - Suzy Bogguss, Aaron Tippin
 2000 - Ricky Van Shelton, Cletus T. Judd, Tracy Byrd
 2001 - Tracy Lawrence, The Bellamy Brothers, The Kinleys
 2002 - Highway 101, Trace Adkins, John Anderson
 2003 - Neal McCoy, Doug Stone, Ricochet
 2004 - Sammy Kershaw, Jeff Bates, Honky Tonk Tailgate Tour, Chad Brock, Rhett Akins, David Kersh, Daryle Singletary
 2005 - Joe Diffie, Pam Tillis, Andy Griggs
 2006 - Marty Stuart, Exile, Little Texas, Billy Dean, Kelsey
 2007 - Emerson Drive, Keith Anderson, Shane Prather
 2008 - Charlie Daniels
 2009 - Jamey Johnson, LoCash Cowboys, Honky Tonk Tailgate Tour (Mark Wills, Trent Willmon, Jeff Bates), The Lost Trailers
 2010 - LoCash Cowboys, Colt Ford, Chris Young, Matt Carr Band
 2011 - Easton Corbin, Jake Owen
 2012 - Brett Eldredge, Craig Campbell, Randy Houser
 2013 - Frank Foster, LoCash Cowboys, Earl Thomas Conley, Chris Cagle
 2014 - Chris Janson, Craig Morgan
 2015 - Chase Bryant, Travis Tritt
 2016 - Jeff Bates, Brothers Osborne, The Bellamy Brothers, LOCASH
 2017 - William Michael Morgan, Little Texas, Drake White and the Big Fire

References 

Music festivals in Mississippi
Tourist attractions in Lawrence County, Mississippi